Prorella is a genus of moths in the family Geometridae erected by William Barnes and James Halliday McDunnough in 1918.

Species
Prorella albida (Cassino & Swett, 1923)
Prorella artestata (Grossbeck, 1908)
Prorella desperata (Hulst, 1896)
Prorella discoidalis (Grossbeck, 1908)
Prorella emmedonia (Grossbeck, 1908)
Prorella gypsata (Grote, 1882)
Prorella insipidata (Pearsall, 1910)
Prorella irremorata (Dyar, 1923)
Prorella leucata (Hulst, 1896)
Prorella mellisa (Grossbeck, 1908)
Prorella ochrocarneata McDunnough, 1949
Prorella opinata (Pearsall, 1909)
Prorella protoptata (McDunnough, 1938)
Prorella remorata (Grossbeck, 1907)
Prorella tremorata McDunnough, 1949

References

  2011: A morphological review of tribes in Larentiinae (Lepidoptera: Geometridae). Zootaxa, 3136: 1–44. Preview

External links

Eupitheciini